The Order of Civil Merit was established by King Alfonso XIII of Spain in 1926.  The order recognizes "the civic virtue of officers in the service of the Nation, as well as extraordinary service by Spanish and foreign citizens for the benefit of Spain."

History 
According to Basic Norms on Protocol & Decorations The Order of Civil Merit was established by King Alfonso XIII of Spain, by Royal Decree on 25 June 1926, after the proposition of the President of the Council of Ministers, General D. Miguel Primo de Rivera (1870–1930). Its first regulations was published next 25 May 1927.

This Order was created to reward civic virtues of the functionaries in service for the State, the Provinces and Municipalities, as well as extraordinary services performed by Spanish citizens for the good of Nation, and could possibly be awarded, moreover, to foreign citizens by courtesy or reciprocity.

At the origin, it consisted of five categories: 
 Grand Cross (Gran Cruz)
 Commander by Number (Comendador de Número)
 Commander (Comendador)
 Knight (Caballero)
 Silver Cross (Cruz de Plata)

Entry into the Order was conferred by the King, upon proposition of the Minister of State, requiring the agreement of the Council of Ministers when it concerned the concession of the Grand Cross, instructing them in all cases a demonstrative record of the justification of the award and issuing appointments and diplomas by the Section of Foreign Ministry and Orders of the Ministry of State.

The Provisional Government of the Republic, by decree of 24 July 1931, abolished this order and other orders of the State, except that of Isabel the Catholic, and wanted to replace them with the creation of the Order of the Republic.

Saved this interregnum, by Decree of 7 November 1942 restores the Order of Civil Merit, with his previous features, privileges and seniority, with the following categories: Grand Cross, Cordon (designation of the Grand Cross when given to women), Commander of Number, Commander, Officer, Knight, Knot (name of degree Knight when given to women) and Silver Cross, approving its rules by decree of 3 February 1945.

Subsequently, by decree of 26 July 1957, the Knight of the Collar category is established in the Order of Civil Merit, as the highest distinction of the Order. This high level is reserved to decorate Sovereigns and Heads of State and, exceptionally, to those, enjoying relevant significance, who are already in possession of the Grand Cross of the Order.

The great changes since that date, both in the social and political reality of Spain, and in the legal and administrative system, have been advised to update the rules governing the Order respecting the spirit that inspired its creation and preserving its seniority and their order of priority among the other Spanish Orders.

Thus, by Royal Decree 2396/1998 of 6 November 1998, published in the Boletín Oficial del Estado 279 of 21 November 1998 (and subsequent correction published in the BOE 40 of 16 February 1999), the approval of the new regulations proceeded, bringing together in one legal text all regulations which were scattered.

Among the most notable elements of the new regulation, one may mention suppression of the names of the degrees of Lady's Cordon, Knight's Cross and Dame's Knot, joining the first in that of Grand Cross, and creating the degree of Cross, including the two others, to avoid interpretations that would consider the maintenance of these designations may involve some form of discrimination based on gender.

Furthermore, it empowers the decorated women, for aesthetic and functional reasons (given the characteristics of their gala dress), to use miniature versions of  the insignia, and to hang them differently from the men, as specified for each grade in the new regulation.

Two new forms of badges in the degree of Commander were regulated to grant awards to juridical persons: the Tie, for institutions that have recognized the use of flags or similar ensigns, and the Badge of Honour for institutions that do not possess these emblems.

Finally, in order to lend prestige to the distinctions of this Order and ensure that each is properly justified, the current regulation makes a detailed discussion of the merits to be considered for grant, of formal requirements to be met by proposals for entry and promotion within the Order, stating the legitimate authorities to do them, and reporting procedures that can be instructed in order to determine the suitability of granting.

 Grades 
The ribbon of the order is blue with a narrow white centre stripe, except for the ribbon of "Collar", which is blue with 2 white stripes on the edges.

The Order of Civil Merit comes in seven classes as follows:
 Collar (Collar) - Order's Collar.
 Grand Cross (Gran Cruz) - Sash and Plaque (Golden Order's Star).
 Commander by Number (Encomienda de Número) - Plaque (Silver Order's Star).
 Commander (Encomienda) - Golden order's star on a necklet.
 Officer's Cross (Cruz de Oficial) - Golden order's cross hanging from a ribbon.
 Knight's Cross (Cruz) - Silver order's cross hanging from a ribbon.
 Silver Cross (Cruz de Plata'') - Simpler silver cross hanging from a ribbon.

Notable recipients of Collar or Grand Cross
The Collar and Grand Cross of the Order have been awarded to royalty, heads of state and their spouses, and diplomats, including:

Heads of state
 2023:  João Lourenço and Ana Dias Lourenço, president and first lady of the Angola
 2021:  Moon Jae-in and Kim Jung-sook, president and first lady of the Republic of Korea
 2015:  Mohamed Ould Ahmed Salem Ould Mohamed Rare interior minister of Mauritania
 2012:  Felipe Calderón Hinojosa, president of Mexico
 2009:  Sir Kenneth Hall and Lady Rheima Hall, governor-general and first lady of Jamaica
 2010:  Petro Poroshenko, president of Ukraine (then minister of foreign affairs)
 2008:  Khalifa bin Zayed Al Nahyan, president of the United Arab Emirates
 2007:  Roh Moo-hyun and Kwon Yang-suk, president and first lady of the Republic of Korea
 2003:  Georgi Parvanov and Zorka Parvanova, president and first lady of Bulgaria
 2003:  Ion Iliescu, president of Romania
 2003:  Islom Karimov, president of Uzbekistan
 2002:  Abdelaziz Bouteflika, president of Algeria
 1999:  Petar Stoyanov and Antonina Stoyanova, president and first lady of Bulgaria
 1996:  Leonid Kuchma and Lyudmila Kuchma, president and first lady of Ukraine
 1995:  Mohamed Mahathir, prime minister of Malaysia
 1994:  Fidel V. Ramos and Amelita Ramos, president and first lady of the Philippines
 1993:  Zhelyu Zhelev and Maria Zheleva, president and first lady of Bulgaria
 1994:  Maaouya Ould Sid'Ahmed Taya and Aïcha Mint Ahmed Tolba, president and first lady of Mauritania
 1988:  Bacharuddin Jusuf Habibie, president of Indonesia
 1979:  Félix Houphouët-Boigny, president of Côte d'Ivoire
 1978:  Saddam Hussein, then vice president of Iraq
 1968:  Habib Bourguiba and Wassila Ben Ammar, president and first lady of Tunisia
 1968:  Habib Bourguiba Jr., minister of foreign affairs of Tunisia
 1965:  Chiang Kai-shek, president of the Republic of China
 1957:  Camille Chamoun, president of Lebanon

Foreign royalty
 2021:  Prince Daniel, Duke of Västergötland of Sweden
 2021:  Princess Sofia, Duchess of Värmland of Sweden
 2021:  Prince Carl Philip, Duke of Värmland of Sweden
 2008:  H.H.E. Sheikh Sabah Al Ahmed Al Sabah of Kuwait
 2008:  Crown Prince Mohammed bin Zayed of Abu Dhabi
 2006:  Princess Märtha Louise of Norway  
 2000:  King Mohammed VI of Morocco
 2000:  Princess Astrid of Belgium
 2000:  Prince Lorenz of Belgium
 2000:  Prince Laurent of Belgium
 1999:  Princess Alia and husband Mohammad Al-Saleh of Jordan
 1995:  King Ja'afar Yang di-Pertuan Agong of Malaysia
 1995:  Queen Najihah Raja Permaisuri Agong of Malaysia
 1966:  King King Faisal of Saudi Arabia
 1962:  King Saud of Saudi Arabia
 1960:  King Rama IX of Thailand
 1955:  Princess Dina of Jordan (then queen)

Others
2018:  Monirul Islam
 2017:  State Minister Nasrul Hamid of Bangladesh
 2017:  Ignacio Echeverría
 2015:  Sushma Swaraj minister of External Affairs of India
2013:  Fadi Al-Atrash Joumblatt
 2009:  Amancio Ortega
 2007:  Miriam Defensor Santiago
 2005:  Abderrahim Harouchi
1948:  J. Hunter Guthrie

Gallery

References

External links

 World Awards

 
Civil Merit, Order of
Civil Merit, Order of
Awards established in 1926
1926 establishments in Spain